Adnan Sajid Khan, is an Indian comedian and actor, popularly known by his stage name Gullu Dada and Gullu Bhai.

Career
Adnan Sajid Khan was born in 1965. He initially started as a stage singer in the 90s and eventually became an actor in 2007. He is one of the most popular faces in the Deccani film industry.

He got first break as an actor in RK Mama productions "FM Fun Aur Masti" in which he played the role of a local don, Gullu Dada and eventually got fame through the role. He is most notable for the Bollywood Movie Saajan Chale Sasural 2, directed by N.N Siddiqui.

He has been a part of more than 20 movies that have been made in the Hyderabadi language with most of them completing 50 days in theatres in the Nizam Circuit. He is famous for his dialogue  Aaainn!

Gullu Dada's Biryani 
In 2019 Gullu Dada opened a Biryani restaurant. Which serves many varieties of Biryani most notably Zafrani (Saffron) Biryani

The franchise has since expanded to 4 branches:

 Masabtank, opposite MS College
 Attapur, At Pillar No. 121.
 Shaikhpet, beside D-Mart Aaaien
 Abids, beside State Bank of India

Filmography

References

External links

Adnan Sajid Khan on Facebook 
Adnan Sajid Khan on Instagram

Living people
1963 births
Indian male film actors
Indian male comedians
21st-century Indian male actors